Hylton Hall was a historic dormitory building located at Danville, Virginia. It was built about 1918, and was a six-story, five-bay, "H"-shaped brick and frame building in the Classical Revival style.  The front facade featured a full-height entry portico supported by classical columns and the building was topped by a roof with various shapes and pitches.  Also on the property was a contributing a one-story shop building built about 1928.  It was built as a hotel-style dormitory for single female workers of The Riverside & Dan River Cotton Mills, Incorporated (Dan River Mills).  It continued as a residential facility until 1948 when it was converted to offices.

On April 15, 2012, a fire ruled to be arson destroyed Hylton Hall.  During demolition, a secret room filled with records from the 1800s until 2004 was located.

It was listed on the National Register of Historic Places in 2009.

References

Residential buildings on the National Register of Historic Places in Virginia
Neoclassical architecture in Virginia
Residential buildings completed in 1918
Buildings and structures in Danville, Virginia
National Register of Historic Places in Danville, Virginia